Mikhail Vadimovich Seslavinsky (born 1964) is a Russian researcher in book culture, a bibliophile and  public figure.

Biography

Born February 28, 1964 in the city of Dzerzhinsk (now in the Nizhny Novgorod Region), Seslavinsky graduated with a degree in history from the N. I. Lobachevsky Gorky State University (now N. I. Lobachevsky State University of Nizhny Novgorod).

From 1986 to 1989, he was a faculty member in the social sciences department  at the Dzerzhinsk Branch of Gorky Polytechnic University (now N. I. Lobachevsky State University of Nizhny Novgorod).

In 1990, he was elected people’s deputy of the Russian parliament (Russian Soviet Federative Socialist Republic Supreme Council) for Dzerzhinsk District No. 364, as well as to the Gorky Regional Council of People's Deputies. As a member of the RSFSR Supreme Council, he was a deputy chairman of the Council’s Commission for Culture (1990-1993).

From 1993 to 1998, Seslavinsky served as a member of the State Duma. During this time, he chaired the 1st State Duma Subcommittee for Culture in the Committee for Education, Culture and Science. In the 2nd State Duma he was deputy chairman of the Committee for Culture.

In 1998-1999, he headed the Federal Service for Television and Radio Broadcasting.

From 1999 to 2004, he served as State Secretary and the First Deputy Minister for Press, Television, Radio Broadcasting and Mass Media in the Mikhail Kasyanov's Cabinet.

Since 2004, he has headed the  Federal Agency for Press and Mass Communications until 2020. According to the Presidential Decree of the Russian Federation of November 20, 2020 No 719 "About enhancement of public administration in the sphere of digital development, communication and mass communications" the Federal Agency for Press and Mass Communications is abolished, and its functions are transferred to the Ministry of Digital Development, Communications and Mass Media of the Russian Federation.

At Mikhail Seslavinsky’s initiative an ethics code for broadcasters – called the Charter of Broadcasters of the Russian Federation – was drafted and signed on April 28, 1999 by the heads of the leading Russian TV and radio broadcasters.

From 2001 to 2003, he was a member of the Board of Directors of Public Russian Television (ORT) and Channel One. From 2005 to 2010, he was Chairman of the Board of Directors at Prosveshchenie Publishing House and also the Administrative Direction for Print, Tver Children’s Book Printing and Publishing Integrated Works and the General Directorate for International Book Exhibitions and Fairs.

He is married and has two daughters, born 1994 and 2003. The older daughter Natalia Seslavinskaya has dedicated her career to the book industry, continuing the family tradition.

Mikhail Seslavinsky is also a prominent bibliophile and collector of autographs and rare books from early 19th and 20th centuries. He has donated books and manuscripts to state libraries and collections (State Literary Museum, Library of the Russian Academy of Sciences, Russian State Library, Rudomino State Library for Foreign Literature, State Central Museum of Contemporary History of Russia, Pushkin State Museum, Admiral Lazarev Naval Library, Dmitry Mendeleev and Alexander Blok State Memorial Museum Reserve and Solzhenitsyn Center of Russian Emigré Studies).

Since February 2011, he has chaired the Council of the National Union of Bibliophiles. He has authored numerous articles on bibliology. A full bibliography of his works was published by Pashkov Dom Publishing House of the Russian State Library in 2014 under the title Mikhail Seslavinsky, Bibliophile and Bibliologist: Bibliographical Reference compiled by Leonid Fursenko with an introduction by Alexander Samarin.

Since 2008 Mikhail Seslavinsky has chaired the editorial board of the bibliophile magazine "Pro knigi" ("About books").

He is also the author of the book of children's stories Chastnoe pionerskoe (Private life of Soviet pioneers) which was made into a film of the same name; the collection of articles Homo Scriptoris [=Writing Man]; the books The Scent of a Book Binding (bibliophile album), Polaris (about the adventures of a bobcat in Finland) and The Rendezvous (Russian artists as depicted in French books of the first half of the 20th century); the album Books for Book Lovers (co-authored with Moscow State Printing University professor Olga Tarakanova); the album A Garland of Books and Pictures (children's reading in pre-revolutionary Russia); and the monograph French Bibliophilic Books with Drawings of Russian Émigré Artists (1920s-1940s). He also compiled the collection Tamizdat: 100 Selected Books a collection of articles about books by famous Russian writers and poets (Marina Tsvetaeva, Igor Severyanin, Boris Pasternak, Ioseph Brodsky, etc.), a catalogue titled a Bibliophile’s Wreath to Anna Akhmatova: Marking 125th Birthday – Autographs by Mikhail Seslavinsky; banned in the USSR, thair books were published abroad, as well as the album The Art of the Autograph and My Friend Osip Mandelstam. Selected Illustrated Bibliography and Autographs, and Rare Russian Books of the 20th Century: 333 Selected Books, Marina Tsvetayeva’s Bibliophilic Garland, A Cantata to the Cantata.

To mark the 175th anniversary of Anatole France’s birth, a collection of his writings has been designed and published, with an afterword titled Anatole France’s Russian Eatery. The book also includes some previously unknown drawings by Tatyana Mavrina and Antonina Sofronova: France, Anatole, At the Sign of Reine Pédauque. Revolt of the Angels, St. Petersburg, Vita Nova Publishers, 2019.

Seslavinsky is a member of the Board of Trustees at State Tretyakov Gallery, the Russian State Archive of Literature and Art, the Orthodox Encyclopedia, and chairs the Boards of Trustees at the Ivan Fyodorov Moscow State University of Printing Arts.

On August 26, 2013, Mikhail Seslavinsky joined the Council for the Russian Government Media Award. He has been member of the State Radio Frequency Commission since 2004, the Government Commission on Television and Radio Broadcasting, as well as the Government Commission on Religious Organizations.

Mikhail Seslavinsky chaired the Korney Chukovsky 125th birthday celebration committee and the Lydia Chukovskaya 100th birthday celebration committee.

He was Deputy Chairman of the Russian Year of Literature Organizing Committee in 2015.

Mikhail Seslavinsky chaired the Organizing Committee for preparing and holding celebrations of Konstantin Simonov’s 100 birthday.

Mikhail Seslavinsky chaired the Organizing Committee for preparing and holding celebrations of Osip Mandelstam’s 125th birthday.

Mikhail Seslavinsky chaired the Organizing Committees for preparing and holding celebrations of Konstantin Paustovsky’s and Marina Tsvetaeva’s 125th birthdays.

He is Deputy Chairman of the Organizing Committee for preparing and holding celebrations of Maxim Gorky’s 150th birthday in 2018.

He is also Deputy Chairman of the Organizing Committee for preparing and holding celebrations of Alexander Solzhenitsyn’s 100th birthday in 2018.

He chairs the Organizing Committee for preparing and holding celebrations of Nikolay Nekrasov’s 200th birthday in 2021.

He chairs the Organizing Committee for preparing and holding celebrations of Ivan Bunin’s 150th birthday in 2020.

Mikhail Seslavinsky holds a Ph.D. in History, and is an Associate Member of the Russian Academy of Arts (Department of Art History and Art Criticism).

Seslavinsky has received a number of Russian state awards. He is a Knight of the Order of the Legion of Honor, a decoration he was awarded for his efforts to promote cultural ties between France and Russia.

 Izvestia 23 Dec 2014
 RBK 23 Dec 2014
 Izvestia 76 Nov 2014
 Investigative Committee of Inquiry to the head Rospechat Michael of "anti-state media" - Moskovsky Komsomolets", April 7, 2015
 On financing Rospechat opposition media pool - Lenta.Ru, April 8, 2015
 From 2010 to 2014 Rospechat "into significant financial injections from the state budget in the media whose editorial policy had a pronounced anti-state position." – RBC, April 27, 2015
 Rospechat accused of financing anti-state media - Echo de Moscou, April 8, 2015
 Investigation Committee of suspected Rospechat financing of independent media - New newspaper,  April 10, 2015
 Rospechat financed TV channel "Rain" for 30 million rubles  - Izvestia, April 7, 2015
 Michail Seslavinsky: Of “The Literature Year” surprises and unique projects 
 Seslavinsky: “The Literature Year” will be versatile in Moscow and in regions
 Russian Government Direction

References

External links

 Art et Métiers du Livre n° 302 GRÉGOIRE LEVITZKY : ENQUÊTE SUR UN RELIEUR D'ART ATYPIQUE. SESLAVINSKY M.

1964 births
Living people
1st class Active State Councillors of the Russian Federation
Chevaliers of the Légion d'honneur
Corresponding Members of the Russian Academy of Arts
First convocation members of the State Duma (Russian Federation)
Second convocation members of the State Duma (Russian Federation)
People from Dzerzhinsk, Russia
Recipients of the Order "For Merit to the Fatherland", 4th class
Recipients of the Order of Honour (Russia)
Russian male journalists